Rab11 family-interacting protein 5 is a protein that in humans is encoded by the RAB11FIP5 gene.

Interactions 

RAB11FIP5 has been shown to interact with RAB11A and RAB25.

Vesicle trafficking 
 
Rab11FIP5 is one of the many proteins that have been shown to interact with the Rab11 protein. Rab GTPases, such as Rab11, are enzymes that are involved in vesicular trafficking. Rab11 specifically plays a key role in endocytic trafficking and recycling through guiding early endosomes to endosome recycling complexes. Rab11FIP5, like most other Rab11FIP proteins, interacts with Rab11 by serving as an adaptor protein. This leads to downstream changes with regards to which proteins can interact. This is a result of the various Rab11FIP proteins that each have different binding partners. This process allows for the coordination and organization of endosomal transport and ultimately gives Rab11 its versatile function in the cell. It is believed that Rab11 recruits specific Rab11FIP proteins to the surface of vesicles in order to determine how the vesicle will behave.
 
Studies have shown that Rab11FIP5 localizes to the perinuclear endosomes where it aids in sorting vesicles into the slow recycling route. This process involves the transport of cargo proteins, like endocytosed receptors, to endosome recycling complexes and subsequently to the plasma membrane. This is in contrast to the fast constitutive recycling route which allows for the direct transport of cargo from the endosome to the plasma membrane. Rab11FIP5 aids in this sorting process by binding to kinesin II and forming a protein complex to regulate vesicular trafficking. Some of the proteins that are regulated through Rab11FIP5 mediated vesicle trafficking are microtubule proteins and the TfR receptor. This links Rab11FIP5 functionality to the cell cytoskeleton and the iron uptake of a cell, respectively.

Other functions
 
Rab11FIP5 has been shown to play a role in the nervous system because it functions in neurons. Studies have suggested that Rab11FIP5 is involved in regulating the localization of the postsynaptic AMPA-type glutamate receptor. The AMPA receptor is an excitatory receptor that can be found on the plasma membranes of neurons. Studies have shown that mice with the Rab11FIP5 gene knocked out have severe long term neuronal depression. Without the presence of Rab11FIP5, it is hypothesized that the internalized AMPA receptors cannot be recycled back onto the plasma membrane because the receptors cannot be correctly trafficked to intracellular organelles responsible for recycling.
 
Rab11FIP5 has also been implicated as a protein involved in the creation of tissue polarity during development. Rab11FIP5 has been shown to be involved in the vesicle trafficking and degradation of proteins used to coordinate embryonic development. This is conducted in a manner that helps maintain the ectoderm polarity in embryonic Drosophila.
 
Rab11FIP5 is also suggested to be involved in aiding salivary epithelial cells to adjust to extracellular pH. V-ATPase, a proton pump protein, has been shown to be reliant on Rab11FIP5 mediated vesicle trafficking. When Rab11FIP5 is knocked down, salivary cells cannot correctly translocate V-ATPase to the plasma membrane in response to extracellular acidosis. While this pathway remains largely unknown, these results suggest a link between Rab11FIP5 function and the maintenance of the buffering capacity of saliva.

Rab11FIP5 is also required for regulated exocytosis in neuroendocrine cells. Knockdown of Rab11FIP5 inhibited calcium-stimulated dense core vesicle (DCV) exocytosis in a neuroendocrine cell line BON cells. DCV membrane proteins are lost to the plasma membrane during exocytosis and recycle to the Golgi through the retrograde trafficking pathway. The requirement of Rab11FIP5 for regulated DCV exocytosis may be attributed to its role in endosome-mediated retrograde trafficking.

References

Further reading